The 1990–91 Yorkshire Cup was the eighty-third occasion on which the  Yorkshire Cup competition had been held.

Castleford won the trophy by beating Wakefield Trinity by the score of 11-8

The match was played at Elland Road,  Leeds, now in West Yorkshire. The attendance was 12,420 and receipts were £61,432

This was the seventh time in the incredible eleven-year period in which Castleford. previously only once winners in 1977, will make eight appearances in the Yorkshire Cup final, winning on four and ending as runner-up on four occasions. It was also the first of what would be two victories for Castleford in two successive finals. within that eleven-year period.

Background 
This season there were no junior/amateur clubs taking part, no new entrants and no "leavers" and so the total of entries remained the  same at eighteen.

This in turn resulted in the necessity to continue with a preliminary round to reduce the  number of clubs entering the first round to sixteen.

Competition and results

Preliminary round 
Involved 2 matches and 4 clubs

Round 1 
Involved  8 matches (with no byes) and 16 clubs

Round 2 - Quarter-finals 
Involved 4 matches and 8 clubs

Round 3 – Semi-finals  
Involved 2 matches and 4 clubs

Final

Teams and scorers 

Scoring - Try = four points - Goal = two points - Drop goal = one point

The road to success 
The  following chart excludes any preliminary round fixtures/results

Brief report on the  final 
According to the League Express match reporter Mike Beevers (abridged as follows) :-

In front of  almost 12,500 fans paying over £60,000, Castleford finally got rid of their Elland Road bogey, having lost all three previous Yorkshire Cup finals played at this ground, by beating local rivals Wakefield Trinity 11-8 in this year's Yorkshire Cup final.

Wakefield stand-off Tracey Lazenby made the break that produced the first try of the match for Andy Mason, which Kevin Harcombe converted from touch.

Castleford hit back through Gary Atkins, but Lee Crooks failed to convert.

Before half time Wakefield went further ahead through a penalty from Kevin Harcombe.

Lee Crooks cut the deficit with a penalty of his own on 49 minutes.

The introduction of international prop Keith ‘Beefy’ England changed the game and, shortly afterwards, winger David Plange, playing his first game of the season, followed up a great trysaving tackle on Andy Mason by scoring the game’s crucial try, which came from a long ball from hooker Graham Southernwood. Skipper Lee Crooks converted to pick up his fifth winners’ medal in the competition, after having won three times with Hull and once with Leeds.

Wakefield stand-off Tracey Lazenby won the White Rose Trophy as man of the match

Notes and comments 
1 * Match transferred from  the  home ground of Harvey Hadden Stadium to Doncaster,s Bentley Road Stadium/Tattersfield in hope of bigger attendance etc.

2 * At the  time this was the   Hull Kingston Rovers record score

3* The  highest score and winning margin and first time over 100 points scored - in a Yorkshire Cup tie

4 * The first Yorkshire Cup match to be played at Ryedale-York's new stadium

5 * 'Match played at Valley Parade, home of  Bradford City A.F.C.

6 * Elland Road,  Leeds,  is the home ground of Leeds United A.F.C. with a capacity of 37,914 (The record attendance was 57,892 set on 15 March 1967 for a cup match Leeds v Sunderland). The ground was originally established in 1897 by Holbeck RLFC who played there until their demise after the conclusion of the 1903-04 season

General information for those unfamiliar 
The Rugby League Yorkshire Cup competition was a knock-out competition between (mainly professional) rugby league clubs from  the  county of Yorkshire. The actual area was at times increased to encompass other teams from  outside the  county such as Newcastle, Mansfield, Coventry, and even London (in the form of Acton & Willesden).

The Rugby League season always (until the onset of "Summer Rugby" in 1996) ran from around August-time through to around May-time and this competition always took place early in the season, in the Autumn, with the final taking place in (or just before) December (The only exception to this was when disruption of the fixture list was caused during, and immediately after, the two World Wars)

See also 
1990–91 Rugby Football League season
Rugby league county cups

References

External links
Saints Heritage Society
1896–97 Northern Rugby Football Union season at wigan.rlfans.com 
Hull&Proud Fixtures & Results 1896/1897
Widnes Vikings - One team, one passion Season In Review - 1896–97
The Northern Union at warringtonwolves.org

RFL Yorkshire Cup
Yorkshire Cup